Marin Jurina (born 26 November 1993) is a professional Bosnian football centre-forward who plays for Saudi club Al-Faisaly.

Club career
On 22 January 2020 he signed a contract to Hungarian first division team Mezőkövesdi SE.

On 26 August 2022, Jurina joined Saudi club Al-Faisaly.

References

External links

1993 births
Living people
Sportspeople from Livno
Croats of Bosnia and Herzegovina
Association football forwards
Bosnia and Herzegovina footballers
HNK Hajduk Split players
NK Primorac 1929 players
HŠK Zrinjski Mostar players
NK Zadar players
FC Etzella Ettelbruck players
HNK Čapljina players
FC Koper players
NK Ankaran players
NK Krško players
NK Čelik Zenica players
FK Shkupi players
Mezőkövesdi SE footballers
Al-Faisaly FC players
Croatian Football League players
First Football League (Croatia) players
Luxembourg National Division players
Slovenian PrvaLiga players
Slovenian Second League players
Premier League of Bosnia and Herzegovina players
Macedonian First Football League players
Nemzeti Bajnokság I players
Saudi First Division League players
Bosnia and Herzegovina expatriate footballers
Expatriate footballers in Croatia
Expatriate footballers in Luxembourg
Expatriate footballers in Slovenia
Expatriate footballers in North Macedonia
Expatriate footballers in Hungary
Expatriate footballers in Saudi Arabia
Bosnia and Herzegovina expatriate sportspeople in Croatia
Bosnia and Herzegovina expatriate sportspeople in Luxembourg
Bosnia and Herzegovina expatriate sportspeople in Slovenia
Bosnia and Herzegovina expatriate sportspeople in North Macedonia
Bosnia and Herzegovina expatriate sportspeople in Hungary
Bosnia and Herzegovina expatriate sportspeople in Saudi Arabia